Archytas is a genus of flies in the family Tachinidae.

Species
Subgenus Archytas Jaennicke, 1867
A. amethystinus (Macquart, 1843)
A. analis (Fabricius, 1805)
A. apicifer (Walker, 1849)
A. californiae (Walker, 1853)
A. candens (Walker, 1849)
A. lobulatus Curran, 1928
A. marmoratus (Townsend, 1915)
A. nivalis Curran, 1928
A. nonamensis Ravlin, 1984
A. rufiventris Curran, 1928
Subgenus Nemochaeta van der Wulp, 1888
A. aterrimus (Robineau-Desvoidy, 1830)
A. convexiforceps Brooks, 1949
A. instabilis Curran, 1928
A. lateralis (Macquart, 1843)
A. metallicus (Robineau-Desvoidy, 1830)

References

Tachininae
Tachinidae genera
Taxa named by Johann Friedrich Jaennicke